Trifurcula sanctibenedicti is a moth of the family Nepticulidae. It is found in Spain.

The wingspan is 5-5.5 mm.

The larvae feed on Bupleurum fruticescens. They mine the leaves of their host plant. The mine consists of a corridor, mostly starting in or near the tip of the leaf and winding in two loops along the parallel leaf veins. The mine is on the upper-surface and whitish, resembling a Diptera mine. The frass is deposited in a narrow, dark brown or black, often interrupted, central line, occupying about one third of the width of the corridor. Pupation takes place outside of the mine.

External links
bladmineerders.nl
Fauna Europaea
Beiträge Zur Kenntnis der Nepticuliden. Beschreibung Zweier Neuer Arten Stigmella abaiella n.sp. Und Trifurcula (Fedalmia) sanctibenedicti n.sp. (Lepidoptera, Monotrysia)

Nepticulidae
Moths of Europe
Moths described in 1979